This is a list of Australian films scheduled for release in 2018.

2018

See also
 2018 in Australia
 2018 in Australian television
 List of 2018 box office number-one films in Australia

References

2018
Lists of 2018 films by country or language
Films